Tillandsia chontalensis, synonym Vriesea chontalensis, is a species of flowering plant in the family Bromeliaceae, native from Central America (Costa Rica, Honduras, Nicaragua, Panama) to Colombia, north west Ecuador and west Bolivia. It was first described by John Gilbert Baker in 1887.

References

chontalensis
Flora of Bolivia
Flora of Colombia
Flora of Costa Rica
Flora of Ecuador
Flora of Honduras
Flora of Nicaragua
Flora of Panama
Plants described in 1887